The Umayyad desert castles, of which the desert castles of Jordan represent a prominent part, are fortified palaces or castles in what was the then Umayyad province of Bilad al-Sham. Most Umayyad "desert castles" are scattered over the semi-arid regions of north-eastern Jordan, with several more in Syria, Israel and the West Bank (Palestine).

Name
What is known in English as a "desert castle" is known in Arabic as qaṣr (singular), quṣur being the plural. However, qasr is a widely-used Arabic word for palace, castle or fortress, so only a few of the buildings called quṣur are "desert castles".

Brief description
The Umayyads erected a number of characteristic palaces, some in the cities, but mostly in the semi-arid regions, and some along important trading routes. The castles were built roughly between 660 and 750 under the Umayyad Caliphate, which had made Damascus, now in Syria, their new capital in 661. After the Abbasid Revolution of 750, the capital moved to the newly-built Baghdad and some of the buildings were never completed.

The typical desert castle is more than a single residence; rather it is a compound of various building including a substantial main residence along with other buildings such as a hammam (bath-house), storage areas and other agrarian structures and possibly a mosque, all within a large enclosure. Desert castles are typically situated near a wadi or seasonal water course.

The inner part of the main residence typically consists of two-storeys, arranged around a central courtyard. The main residence is often richly ornamented with mosaics, frescoes and stucco reliefs. 

Archaeologists have investigated the role of these desert castles, with the traditional view that they served as country estates or hunting lodges for the use of aristocratic families during the winter season. However, recent scholarship has suggested a much greater diversity of roles, including as agricultural estates or military forts. The complex at Qasr al-Hayr al-Gharbi (Syria), for example, sits within a vast agricultural estate and the buildings include structures associated with the production of olive oil.

Layout and decoration
With a few exceptions, the desert castles conform to a common template consisting of a square structure similar to Roman forts ("castra") as their main building, typically boasting an elaborate entrance. Other buildings in the complex would include a hammam (bath house), a mosque, and often an agricultural enclosure (walled areas for animals, dedicated buildings for processing produce such as olive oil), and a water reservoir or dam. The interior rooms of the main structure were ornately decorated with floor-mosaics, and wall paintings featuring designs that exhibit both eastern and western influences.

Some of the desert castles, for example Qasr Hallabat or Qasr Burqu', are rebuilt from remains of earlier Roman or Ghassanid structures; others are new constructions.

Purpose
The function and use of the buildings are today not entirely clear, and scholarship has suggested that they might have served a variety of defensive, agricultural, residential, recreational and commercial purposes. The earliest researchers, such as  Musil and Lammens, suggested that desert castles were primarily used for recreational purposes: to escape bad air associated with city living to escape epidemic outbreaks; to indulge hedonic pleasures or for use as hunting lodges.<ref>Genequand. D., “Ummayid Castles: The Shift from Late Antique Military Architecture to Early Islamic Palatial Building” in: Hugh N.Kennedy (ed),Muslim Military Architecture in Greater Syria: From the Coming of Islam to the Ottoman Period, Brill, 2006, pp 3 -13; The Articulation of Early Islamic State Structures, Routledge, 2012; Genequant, D., “Desert castles, Umayyad,” in: The Encyclopedia of Ancient History, Wiley, 2018 https://doi.org/10.1002/9781444338386.wbeah12066.pub2; The Lineaments of Islam: Studies in Honor of Fred McGraw Donner, BRILL, 2012, p. 430</ref>  Yet other scholars, investigating the geographic distribution of desert castles have noted that they are principally situated along the silk road or pilgrimage routes and may have operated as a type of caravanserai. 

Given the variety observed in the archaeological record, it is unlikely that one single theory can explain the range of purposes of all the buildings. These functions include fortresses, meeting places for Bedouins (between themselves or with the Umayyad governor),  (retreats for the nobles) or caravanserais.  A proliferation of desert castles appeared around the same time as the number of caravans increased substantially. Many seem to have been surrounded by natural or man-made oases and to have served as country estates or hunting lodges, given that hunting was a favoured pastime for the aristocracy.

The generic term "desert castle" is not ideal, since it artificially separates similar quṣur according to their location. Jordan possesses at least one urban Umayyad qaṣr: the Amman Citadel. While the majority of quṣur are located in Jordan, examples can also be found in Syria, the West Bank and Israel, either in cities (Jerusalem), in relatively green areas (al-Sinnabra, Khirbat al-Minya), or indeed in the desert (Qasr al-Hayr al-Gharbi and Qasr al-Hayr al-Sharqi, Jabal Sais, Hisham's Palace). The more isolated "desert castles" built in arid regions, are chiefly located on the ancient trade routes connecting Damascus with Medina and Kufa or adjacent to a natural oasis. Their location along major routes and next to the very scarce water sources seems to indicate that they enabled the Umayyads to control the roads militarily, monitor and tax the seasonal movement of people and their livestock, and not least, impress travellers and local tribes with lavish displays of monumental architecture, baths and ponds in the middle of an arid landscape.

Most of the desert palaces were abandoned after the Umayyads fell from power in 750, leaving many projects uncompleted and others were left to decay.

Artistic value
The castles represent some of the most impressive examples of early Islamic art and Islamic architecture, and some are notable for including many figurative frescos and reliefs depicting people and animals, less frequently found in later Islamic art on such a large and public scale. Many elements of the desert palaces are on display in museums in Amman, in Jerusalem's Rockefeller Museum (decorations from Hisham's Palace) and the Pergamon Museum of Berlin (the Mshatta Facade).

List of sites
Jordan

Partial alphabetical list by main name without article:

 Qasr Ain es-Sil, an Umayyad farming estate with an attached bathing complex in the Azraq oasis, east of Amman
Qasr Bayir constructed in 743 AD by Al-Walid II
 Humayma, site with a qasr where the Abbasid family resided while plotting their rebellion against the Umayyad caliphs, ousting them in 750
 Qasr al-Mushash, qasr on the historical caravan route between Amman and Azraq via Qusayr 'Amra, some 20 km east of Muwaqqar
 The Umayyad Palace, a qasr on the Citadel Hill of Amman
 Umm al-Walid, site of 3 Umayyad qusur with a mosque and an agricultural settlement near Madaba
 Khan az-Zabib, site of two Umayyad qusur with a mosque and a pastoral village, 25 km southeast of Umm al-Walid

Syria
 Al-Bakhra (ancient Avatha) near Palmyra
 Khirbat al-Bayda', well-built qusur in the Hauran, probably Ayyubid but possibly Ghassanid (see 1895 photo by Burchardt).
 Al-Dumayr, site of a qasr possibly dating to the Byzantine period, maybe built by the Ghassanids, but possibly Umayyad as well
 Qasr al-Hayr al-Gharbi, a "desert castle" in the Syrian Desert
 Qasr al-Hayr al-Sharqi, a large "desert castle" in the Syrian Desert of a "different and higher status"
 Qudaym, site of a qasr with a mosque inside its courtyard
 Resafa, city with vast qusur built by Hisham, of a "different and higher status" than the Umayyad castles
 Jabal Sais or Jabal Says, a "desert castle" in Syria north of Azraq

Israel and Palestine
 Hisham's Palace, in Arabic Qasr Hisham or Khirbet el-Mafjar, a "desert castle" on the West Bank near Jericho, Palestine
 Jerusalem, the four probably Umayyad qusur clustered around the southwest corner of the Temple Mount/Haram ash-Sharif
 Qasr al-Minya, a qasr on the Sea of Galilee, Israel
 Al-Sinnabra, a qasr'' on the Sea of Galilee, Israel

Lebanon
 Anjar, in Lebanon, was an Umayyad palace-city built by Caliph al-Walid I

Gallery

See also
 Al-Ukhaidir Fortress (desert castle in Iraq during the early Abbasid period)
 Islamic architecture
 List of castles in Jordan
 Painting of the Six Kings
 Umayyad architecture

References

External links
 Jordanian authority for tourism about the Desert castles
 About the Desert castles
  Shahid Kabir et al., Historical Significance of Strategic Location of Umayyad Desert Palaces, Universiti Sains Malaysia 2010

Castles in Jordan
Umayyad architecture
Tourism in Jordan